Sailing at the 2008 Asian Beach Games were held from 21 October to 25 October 2008 in Bali, Indonesia.

Medalists

Men

Women

Open

Medal table

Results

Men

Mistral light
21–25 October

Mistral heavy
21–25 October

RS:X
21–25 October

Women

Mistral
21–25 October

Open

Laser 4.7
21–25 October

Hobie 16
21–25 October

References
 Official site

2008
2008 Asian Beach Games events
Asian Beach Games
Sailing competitions in Indonesia